

This is a list of the National Register of Historic Places listings in Plymouth County, Massachusetts.

This is intended to be a complete list of the properties and districts on the National Register of Historic Places in Plymouth County, Massachusetts, United States. The locations of National Register properties and districts for which the latitude and longitude coordinates are included below, may be seen in a map.

There are 140 properties and districts listed on the National Register in the county, including 5 National Historic Landmarks.

Current listings

|}

Former listings

|}

See also

 List of National Historic Landmarks in Massachusetts
 National Register of Historic Places listings in Massachusetts

References

.
Plymouth
Plymouth County, Massachusetts